Kilifi is a town on the coast of Kenya,  northeast by road of Mombasa. The town lies on the Kilifi Creek and sits on the estuary of the Goshi River. Kilifi is capital of the Kilifi County and has a population of 122,899 (2009 census).

Kilifi is known for its sandy beaches and for the ruins of Mnarani, including mosques and tombs, dating from the 14th to the 17th century.

Geography and climate
Kilifi town sits on both sides of the estuary and are linked by the Kilifi Bridge which overlooks the estuary. The south side has the Mnarani ruins and Shauri Moyo beach while the north side is the main part of Kilifi Town and Bofa Beach.

The weather is generally warm throughout the year (above 25 °C) with two seasons of moderate rainfall (about 800–1000 mm). Long periods of rain start around March and last into July, while the short periods start around October and last until December.

The terrain is generally flat with sandy-loamy soils. Common trees include Cocos nucifera, Anacadium occidentale, Azadirachta indica, and Mangifera indica.

Demographics
Kilifi is a cosmopolitan town with mixed ethnic groups. The predominant inhabitants (about 80%) are from the Mijikenda groups (mainly Giriama and Chonyi). Other groups include the Swahili-Arab descendants, Barawas, Bajunis, Somalis as well as other groups from inland. There is a handful of Indians, and Europeans, mainly British, German and Italian.

Economy

Like every coastal town, fishing in Kilifi is one of the historical economic activities. With time, the town has slowly been transforming from a fishing village to basic industrial and service.

The growth of the town was mainly fuelled by the cashew nut milling factory between 1976 and 1990; the district has been a producer of cashews since 1930. The town almost became a ghost town when the factory was closed in 1990 due to decline in nuts supply, mismanagement of the factory and increased global competition. Other industrial activities include sisal farming at Kilifi Plantations.

Since 2008 with the transformation of the Kilifi Institute of Agriculture into Pwani University there has been substantial expansion of the service sector as a result of this. Banking activity has been growing with about 7 banks (KCB, Barclays, Postbank, Imperial, Equity, Co operative, Diamond Trust Bank and most recent National Bank) as well as microfinance institutions. Retail business and hotels have historically been significant economic activities. 3 to 4 star hotels include Mnarani Club, Kilifi Bay Beach Resort and Baobab Lodge.

Health
The Kilifi County Hospital, which is also a referral hospital, serves all of Kilifi County, and also supports the KEMRI-Wellcome Trust Research Programme, a large medical research centre collaborative between Kenya's KEMRI and the British Wellcome Trust, known for its work on malaria and bacterial and viral childhood infections. Several other private clinics can be found here. The Khairat Medical Centre which was recently opened is equipped with modern laboratory, x-ray and scan machines with qualified personnel is situated in the Mtaani area of Sokoni Sb-Location opposite Masjid Hudaa.

Notable organizations
Kilifi is home to several notable organizations, including: 
 Pwani University: A university with undergraduate and graduate programs, specializing in Coastal, Marine and Fisheries science, in addition to Agriculture and Microbial Science
 KEMRI-Wellcome Trust: A 25+ year partnership between KEMRI and Wellcome Trust, doing medical research next to the Kilifi District Hospital (http://www.kemri-wellcome.org/)
 Moving the Goalposts: A nonprofit organization founded in 2002, using football as a tool to empower girls and young women
 KOMAZA: A social business growing trees with smallholder farmers for sale as sustainable wood products
 World Vision
 Plan International
 Distant Relatives: A popular eco-lodge & restaurant, which hosts one of Kenya's largest New Year's Eve parties 
 K.E.D.A (Kilifi Education and Development Association)
 The Fred Hollows Foundation

See also
Historic Swahili Settlements

References

External links
 Information Guide Mtwapa City Kilifi District
 more about Kilifi

Swahili people
Swahili city-states
Swahili culture
 
Populated places in Coast Province
Populated coastal places in Kenya
County capitals in Kenya
Populated places in Kilifi County
Ports and harbours of Kenya